Tiberia is a genus of minute parasitic sea snails, marine gastropod molluscs in the family Pyramidellidae, the pyrams and their allies. Tiberia is the only genus in the tribe Tiberiini.

Taxonomy 
According to Schander, Van Aartsen & Corgan (1999) the subfamily Tiberiinae contains a single genus, Tiberia.

Tiberiinae was one of eleven recognised subfamilies in the family Pyramidellidae according to the taxonomy of Ponder & Lindberg (1997).

However, in the taxonomy of Bouchet & Rocroi (2005), this subfamily was downgraded to the rank of tribe Tiberiini in the subfamily Syrnolinae.

Tiberia is the type genus of the tribe Tiberiini.

Description 
The very small shells of the species in this genus have many whorls. They are umbilicate shells that lack both shell sculpture and the apertural tooth or teeth that are characteristic in most other members of the family Pyramidellidae. They may, however, have slight biplicate folds on the columella.

Species 
Species in the genus Tiberia include:
 Tiberia analoga van Aartsen & Corgan, 1996
 Tiberia apicifusca van Aartsen, Gittenberger & Goud, 1998
 Tiberia balteata (A. Adams, 1855)
 Tiberia cathaysiae Saurin, 1959
 Tiberia grimaudi Saurin, 1959
 Tiberia hyalina (Dunker, 1860)
 Tiberia minuscula (Monterosato, 1880) - synonym: Tiberia octaviana Di Geronimo, 1973
 Tiberia navella van Aartsen & Corgan, 1996
 Tiberia ngani Saurin, 1959
 Tiberia nitidula (A. Adams, 1860)
 Tiberia ovata Saurin, 1959
 Tiberia paumotensis (Tryon, 1886)
 Tiberia pusilla (A. Adams, 1854)
 Tiberia semicostata Saurin, 1962
 Tiberia thaii Saurin, 1959
 Tiberia trifasciata (A. Adams, 1863)
Species brought into synonymy
 Tiberia balteatus [sic]: synonym of Tiberia balteata (A. Adams, 1855)
 Tiberia dunkeri (Dall & Bartsch, 1906): synonym of Orinella dunkeri (Dall & Bartsch, 1906)
 Tiberia gisela (Thiele, J., 1925): synonym of Exesilla gisela (Thiele, 1925) 
 Tiberia micalii i Penas & Rolan, 1997: synonym of Pyramidella dolabrata (Linnaeus, 1758)
 Tiberia minusculoides (van Aartsen, Gittenberger & Goud, 1998): synonym of Tiberia minuscula (Monterosato, 1880)
 Tiberia nitidula Adams, A., 1860: synonym of Pyramidella dolabrata (Linnaeus, 1758)
 Tiberia octaviana Di Geronimo, 1973: synonym of Tiberia minuscula (Monterosato, 1880)
 Tiberia pretiosa Coen, 1933: synonym of Chrysallida interstincta (J. Adams, 1797): synonym of Parthenina interstincta (J. Adams, 1797)
 Tiberia pulchella (A. Adams, 1854):  synonym of Orinella pulchella (A. Adams, 1854)

References

 Vaught, K.C. (1989). A classification of the living Mollusca. American Malacologists: Melbourne, FL (USA). . XII, 195 pp.
 Rolán E., 2005. Malacological Fauna From The Cape Verde Archipelago. Part 1, Polyplacophora and Gastropoda.

External links
 Jeffreys J.G. 1884. On the Mollusca procured during the 'Lightning' and 'Porcupine' expeditions, 1868-70. (Part VIII). Proceedings of the Zoological Society of London, 1882: 341-372, pl. 26-28
  Serge GOFAS, Ángel A. LUQUE, Joan Daniel OLIVER,José TEMPLADO & Alberto SERRA (2021) - The Mollusca of Galicia Bank (NE Atlantic Ocean); European Journal of Taxonomy 785: 1–114

Pyramidellidae